Bro Cernyw Football Club is a Welsh football team based in Llangernyw, a Welsh-speaking, village and community in Conwy County Borough, Wales.  The team currently play in the North Wales Coast East Football League Premier Division, which is at the fourth tier of the Welsh football league system.

Honours
Vale of Conwy Football League
Champions: 1993–94, 2000–01
Runners-up: 1991–92, 1992–93

External links
Club official Twitter
Club official Facebook

References

North Wales Coast Football League clubs
Vale of Conwy Football League clubs
Vale of Clwyd and Conwy Football League clubs
Sport in Conwy County Borough
Football clubs in Wales